

Events

Births

Deaths
 Judah Messer Leon (born 1166), French Jewish poet and Rabbi, writing in Hebrew and Aramaic

See also

 Poetry
 List of years in poetry

Poetry
13th-century poetry

References